Poko Mountain is a summit in North Slope Borough, Alaska, in the United States.

Poko is likely derived from an Eskimo word meaning "seal parka".

References

Mountains of Alaska
Mountains of North Slope Borough, Alaska